Gianluca Lamaro is a sailor from Napoli, Italy, who represented his country at the 1984 Summer Olympics in Los Angeles, United States as helmsman in the Soling. With crew members Aurelio Dalla Vecchia and Valerio Romano they took the 9th place. Gianluca took also part in the 1988 Summer Olympics in Busan, South Korea as helmsman in the Soling. With same crew members then they took the 13th place.

References

Living people
1956 births
Sailors at the 1984 Summer Olympics – Soling
Sailors at the 1988 Summer Olympics – Soling
Olympic sailors of Italy
Sportspeople from Naples
Italian male sailors (sport)